The 25th Missouri Infantry Regiment, originally formed as 13th Missouri Volunteer Infantry, was an infantry regiment that served in the Union Army during the American Civil War.

Service
Organized as 13th Missouri Infantry Regiment in June, 1861. Designation changed to 25th Missouri Infantry Regiment in September, 1861. Attached to Dept. of Missouri to March, 1862. 1st Brigade, 6th Division, Army of the Tennessee, to July, 1862, 1st Brigade, 6th Division, District of Corinth, Miss., to September, 1862. 1st Brigade, 2nd Division, District of Southeast Missouri, Dept. of Missouri, to March, 1863. District of Northwest Missouri to June, 1863. New Madrid, Mo., District of Columbus, Ky., 6th Division, 16th Army Corps, Dept. of the Tennessee, to February, 1864.

Detailed service
Duty in Missouri until March, 1862. Ordered to Pittsburg Landing, Tenn. Battle of Shiloh, Tenn., April 6–7. Advance on and siege of Corinth, Miss., April 29-May 30. Duty at Corinth, Miss., building fortifications until September. Ordered to St. Louis, Mo., thence to Pilot Knob and Patterson, Mo. Duty in Southeast Missouri until March, 1863. Moved to Iron Mountain, thence to St. Joseph, Mo., and operating against guerrillas in Northwest Missouri until June. Ordered to New Madrid, Mo., and garrison duty there and reconstructing fortifications until February, 1864. Consolidated with Bissell's Engineer Regiment of the West to form the 1st Regiment Missouri Volunteer Engineers on February 17, 1864.

Casualties
Regiment lost during service 6 Officers and 51 Enlisted men killed and mortally wounded and 3 Officers and 112 Enlisted men by disease. Total 172.

Commanders
 Colonel Everett Peabody
 Colonel Chester Harding Jr.

See also

 Missouri Civil War Union units
 Missouri in the Civil War

Notes

References
 Dyer, Frederick H. A Compendium of the War of the Rebellion (Des Moines, IA:  Dyer Pub. Co.), 1908.
 
Neal, W.A., An Illustrated History of the Missouri Engineer and 25th Infantry Regiments, Chicago, Donohue and Henneberry, 1889

External links
 Link to discussion of Colonel Everett Peabody's key role in the Battle of Shiloh. https://web.archive.org/web/20120222215810/http://thismightyscourge.com/2009/03/25/colonel-everett-peabody-unsung-hero-of-shiloh/

Military units and formations established in 1861
Military units and formations disestablished in 1864
Units and formations of the Union Army from Missouri
1861 establishments in Missouri